Glyptotendipes pallens is a species of fly in the family Chironomidae. It is found in the  Palearctic .

References

Chironomidae
Insects described in 1804
Nematoceran flies of Europe